The Bengal Engineer Group (BEG) (informally the Bengal Sappers or Bengal Engineers) is a military engineering regiment in the Corps of Engineers of the Indian Army. The unit was originally part of the Bengal Army of the East India Company's Bengal Presidency, and subsequently part of the British Indian Army during the British Raj. The Bengal Sappers are stationed at Roorkee Cantonment in Roorkee, Uttarakhand.

The Bengal Sappers are one of the few remaining regiments of the erstwhile Bengal Presidency Army and survived the Rebellion of 1857 due to their "sterling work" in the recapture by the East India Company of Delhi and other operations in 1857–58. The troops of the Bengal Sappers have been a familiar sight for over 200 years in the battlefields of British India with their never-say-die attitude of Chak De and brandishing their favourite tool the hamber.

Over the years the Bengal Sappers have won many battle and theatre honours, 11 Victoria Cross, 116 Indian Order of Merit, 17 Shaurya Chakra, 93 Sena Medals and 11 Arjun Awards, the highest number of won by any single organization in the country. Lt Gen Joginder Singh Dhillon was commissioned into Bengal Engineer Group in 1936 and commanded the First Republic Day Parade in New Delhi, becoming the first army officer to be awarded the Padma Bhushan in November 1965. Among the three Sapper units of the Indian Army, the Bengal Sappers was the first engineer group to receive the 'President Colours' in recognition of its service to the nation, on 12 January 1989, by Ramaswamy Venkataraman, the eight President of India, who presented the Regimental Colours to Bengal Engineer Group at Roorkee.

Besides service on the battlefield, the Bengal Engineers also rendered valuable peacetime contributions. The military engineer Lt. James Agg designed St John's Church, Calcutta. It was based on James Gibbs's St Martin-in-the-Fields in London and was consecrated in 1787. St John's was the Anglican cathedral of the city – capital of the Bengal Presidency – until St Paul's Cathedral, begun 1839, was completed in 1847. St Paul's was also designed by a Bengal Engineer, William Nairn Forbes, who was also architect of the "Old Silver Mint" building at the India Government Mint, Kolkata, basing its portico on the Parthenon on the Acropolis of Athens.

History 

The Indian Army Corps of Engineers is one of the oldest arms of the Indian Army, dating back to 1780, when the two regular pioneer companies of the Madras Sappers were raised, as a part of the East India Company's army. Prior to its formation, by 1740s officers and engineers from the Kingdom of Great Britain served in the Bengal Engineers, Bombay Engineers and Madras Engineers, formed with the respective Presidency armies, while British soldiers served in each of the Presidencies' engineering companies, namely the  Madras Sappers and Miners, Bombay Sappers and Miners, and the Bengal Sappers and Miners.

The Bengal Sappers and Miners was originally the Corps of Bengal Pioneers, which was raised from two pioneer companies in 1803, part of Bengal Army of the Presidency of Bengal; one raised by Capt T. Wood at Kanpur as Bengal Pioneers in November 1803, also known as "Roorkee Safar Maina". In 1819, at the conclusion of Third Maratha War, a part of Bengal Pioneers merged with the Company of Miners (raised in 1808) to become the Bengal Sappers and Miners, and raised at Allahabad, with Captain Thomas Anburey as the Commandant. The remaining part of the Corps of Bengal Pioneers was absorbed in 1833. In 1843 'Broadfoot's Sappers', which had been raised in 1840, merged into the Bengal Sappers and Miners.

In 1847 the Bengal Sappers and Miners was renamed Bengal Sappers and Pioneers, and in 1851 it became the Corps of Bengal Sappers and Miners. On 7November 1853, the regiment moved to Roorkee, where it has maintained its regimental centre ever since. Lord Kitchener of Khartoum's 1903 Kitchener Reforms saw it re-designated as the 1st Sappers and Miners, which was again altered in 1906 to the 1st Prince of Wales's Own Sappers and Miners.

On the accession of George V to the throne in 1910 it was renamed 1st King George V's Own Bengal Sappers and Miners, with the '1st' being dropped in 1923, to make it King George V's Own Bengal Sappers and Miners. In 1937 it was renamed King George V's Bengal Sappers and Miners, and in 1941 they became the 'King George V's Bengal Sappers and Miners Group of the Indian Engineers'. In 1946 it became the 'King George V's Group' of the Royal Indian Engineers. On Indian independence and partition in 1947, about half of the serving personnel were allocated to the Pakistan Royal Engineers. In 1950 they became the Bengal Centre, Corps of Engineers, after which they became the Bengal Engineer Group and Centre.

Battle honours

Colonial India 
Bhurtpore (1825),

First Anglo-Afghan War (1839–1842)
Battle of Ghazni, Kabul 1842

First Anglo-Sikh War
Ferozeshah, Sobraon, Multan, Gujrat,

Second Anglo-Sikh War
Punjab

Indian Rebellion of 1857
Delhi 1857, Lucknow,

Second Anglo-Afghan War
 Afghanistan 1878–80
Ali Masjid, Charasiah, Kabul 1879 Ahmad Khel,

Third Anglo-Burmese War (1885–1887)
 Burma 1885–87

Chitral Expedition (1895)
 Chitral

Tirah (1897–1898)
 Tirah

Boxer Rebellion
 China 1900

World War I
France and Flanders 1914–15:
La Bassée 1914, Festubert 1914, Givenchy 1914, Neuve Chapelle, Festubert 1915, Aubers, Loos
Mesopotamia 1915–18:
Defence of Kut al Amara 1915, Ctesiphon 1915, Tigris 1916, Baghdad, Khan Baghdadi, Sharqat,  Kut al Amara 1917
 Aden
Palestine 1918:
Megiddo, Sharon
Damascus
Persia 1918
 North West Frontier India 1915 & 1916–17, Baluchistan 1918

Third Anglo-Afghan War
Afghanistan 1919.

World War II
Malaya 1941–42
Kampar
North Africa 1940–43
Italy 1943–45
Cassino II
Burma 1942–45
Yenangyaung 1942, Ngakedaung Pass, Jail Hill, Meiktila.

Republic of India 
First Indo-Pakistani War
 Jammu and Kashmir 1947–48

Indo-Pakistani War of 1965
 Jammu and Kashmir 1965
 Punjab 1965
 Rajasthan 1965

Third Indo-Pakistani War
 East Pakistan 1971
 Jammu and Kashmir 1971
 Sindh 1971.

Victoria Cross recipients

See also 
Madras Engineer Group
Bombay Engineer Group

Notes

References
Short Histories:
 The Indian Sappers and Miners,By Lieut.-Colonel E.W.C. Sandes D.S.O., M.C., R.E. (Ret.), Published by The Institution of Royal Engineers, Chatham, 1948. Extracts
 K.S. Calendar of battles, honours and awards : King George V's Own Bengal Sappers & Miners from 1803 to 1939, by Rhamat Ullan Khan, ca. 1944.
 History and digest of service of the 1st King George's Own Sappers & Miners. Roorkee : 1st King's Own Press, (ca. 1911)
 Regimental history of the King George's Own Bengal Sappers & Miners. Roorkee : KGO Sappers & Miners Press, 1937.
 Corps reunion and the unveiling of the war memorial. (Roorkee : King George V's own Bengal sappers and miners group, R.I.E),1927.
 History of the Corps of Royal Engineers, by Great Britain Army. Royal Engineers, Whitworth Porter. Published by Longmans, Green, 1952.
 The Bengal Sappers 1803–2003, by General Sir George Cooper GCB MC and Major David Alexander. .
 The Military Engineer in India, by Lt. Col. E.W.C Sandes. Reprint 2001, Original 1933..

First World War:
 Cunningham, A.H., A Short history of the Corps of King George's Own Bengal Sappers & Miners during the War, 1914-1918. (1930)

Second World War:
 Pearson, G., Brief history of the K.G.V's own Bengal Sappers and Miners Group, R.I.E., August 1939-July 1946. Roorkee : Pearson, 1947.

External links
 Martyrs of Bengal Engineer Group at Indian Army
 The Bengal Snappers - Roorkee, Official website
 Bengal Sappers and Miners on the Royal Engineers website Royal Engineers Museum
 Bengal Sappers and Miners on Regiments.org
 Bengal Sappers and Miners and the Victoria Cross

British Indian Army regiments
Regiments of the Indian Army
Indian Army Corps of Engineers
History of the Bengal Sappers
Honours of the Bengal Sappers
Military units and formations established in 1803
Haridwar district
Indian World War I regiments
Indian World War II regiments
Bengal Presidency
E
1803 establishments in the British Empire